The Roosendaal–Vlissingen railway is a railway line in the Netherlands running from Roosendaal to Vlissingen passing through the provinces of North Brabant and Zeeland. It is also known as Staatslijn F.

Stations 
The following table lists the stations on the railway, along with the year the station first opened and the number of daily passengers of all the stations. This amount is based on figures of the NS.

Train services 
The railway is used by only one service, the intercity service Vlissingen - Roosendaal - Rotterdam Centraal - Den Haag HS (The Hague HS) - Leiden - Haarlem - Amsterdam CS. Between Roosendaal and Vlissingen, the intercity stops at every station.

References 

Railway lines in the Netherlands
Railway lines in North Brabant
Railway lines in Zeeland
Transport in Bergen op Zoom
Transport in Goes
Transport in Middelburg, Zeeland
Transport in Reimerswaal
Transport in Roosendaal
Transport in Vlissingen